= Ross Hill =

English BMX cyclist

Personal information
- Born: c. 1977
- Died: 29 September 2007 (aged 30) Totnes, Devon, England

Cycling career
- Sport: Cycling
- Discipline: BMX
- Role: Rider

Ross Hill (died 29 September 2007) was an English BMX cyclist who won British and European titles.

Hill died at the age of 30 years in the early hours of 29 September 2007 when he was involved in a fatal road accident while walking home from the funeral and wake of his friend Simon Trant in the nearby town of Totnes.
